The Type 214 is a class of diesel-electric submarine developed by exclusively for export by Howaldtswerke-Deutsche Werft GmbH (HDW). It features diesel propulsion with an air-independent propulsion (AIP) system using Siemens polymer electrolyte membrane (PEM) hydrogen fuel cells. The class combines the design principles of the Type 209 submarine family and the  features of the Type 212A submarine. However, as an export design, it lacks some of the classified technologies of the Type 212 such as the non-magnetic steel hull that makes it difficult to detect using a magnetic anomaly detector.

It can also carry food, fresh water and fuel for 84 days of operation.

A contract to build four submarines for the Hellenic Navy was signed 15 February 2000 and a fourth unit was ordered in June 2002. The first submarine was built at HDW in Kiel, Germany and the rest at the Hellenic Shipyards Co. in Skaramangas, Greece. The Hellenic Navy named them the Papanikolis class.

The Republic of Korea Navy has ordered nine Type 214 submarines, designated as Son Won-Il class, to be built in Korea by Hyundai Heavy Industries and Daewoo Shipbuilding & Marine Engineering; three first batch models entered service since 2007, and six second batch models entered service from 2012.

General characteristics

Displacement: 1,690 t surfaced / 1,860 t submerged
Dimensions: length 65 m (213 feet 3 inches ) / beam  6,3 m (20 feet 8 inches) / draught 6 m (19 feet 8 inches)
Pressure hull: HY-100
Armament: 8 x 533 mm torpedo tubes, 4 subharpoon-capable
Propulsion: low noise skew back propeller
Diesel engines: 2 x MTU 16V-396 (3.96 MW)
Charging generators: 2 x Piller Ntb56.40-10 0.97 MW
AIP system: 2 x HDW PEM fuel cell module BZM120 (120 kW x 2)
Electric motor: 1 x Siemens Permasyn (2.85 MW)
Speed: 10 kn surfaced / 20 kn submerged
Speed on fuel cells: 2-6 kn estimated
Range surfaced: 19,300 km (12,000 miles)
Range submerged: 780 km @ 15 km/h (420 nmi @ 8 kn)
Range on fuel cells: 2,310 km @ 7 km/h (1,248 nmi @ 4 kn)
Mission endurance: 12 weeks
Submerged without snorkelling: 3 weeks
Operating depth: more than 250 m (820 feet) officially, 400 m estimated (1312 feet)
Complement: 5 officers + 22 crew
Navigation radar: SPHINX-D with 4 kW pulse and tactical LPI radar sensor [Thales Deutschland Kiel]

Operators

Greece

The Hellenic Navy ordered four Type 214 submarines to be known as the Papanikolis class. The first, Papanikolis, was built in Germany; the following three were scheduled for construction at HDW's Hellenic Shipyards in Greece. In December 2006, StrategyPage reported that Papanikolis was found to have numerous technical problems. Among the reported problems with the submarine were excessive propeller cavitation, overheating of the air-independent propulsion system's fuel cells, and excessive rolling in bad weather when surfaced. Seapower magazine reported the Hellenic Navy refused to accept Papanikolis; additional problems noted were inadequate air-independent propulsion system output power, inappropriate periscope vibration, sonar flank array problems and seawater leakage into the ship's hydraulics.

The Hellenic Navy officers in charge of the testing program at the Kiel shipyards in Germany made their case clear in a 2007 investigative journalism program called "Neoi Fakeloi" on Skai TV (Greece). Retired Rear Admiral M. Simionakis, who had been in charge of the Papanikolis program for the navy, told the interviewer that the manufacturer had made two attempts to fix a severe balance problem in the submarine, including shifting 21 tons of material from the top to the bottom, yet the vessel continued to heel as much as 46 degrees in sea trials. Photographic evidence of the severe heeling was presented. In the same TV program, the officer replacing Simionakis in Kiel, Capt. K. Tziotis, listed seven ongoing, serious problems with the vessel, including balance problems when traveling on the surface, problems with the AIP system, problems with the weapon system, problems with the periscope, and problems with flooding.

TKMS, the German shipbuilder of Type 214, had previously asserted that it solved all the boat's technical problems in 2006 and stated that the Greek Navy's continuing complaints about Papanikolis technical condition are a ploy to justify a price reduction. Therefore, TKMS refused to deliver the boat to the Greek Navy until all debts were paid and Papanikolis remained in Kiel harbor. Despite this position by TKMS, the Hellenic Navy officers in charge of the submarine delivery have repeatedly stated there are problems with Papanikolis. In October 2008, Papanikolis conducted a new round of trials, which showed that the excessive rolling problem had finally been fixed. The rest of the problems are considered solved. According to the Greek defence press, acceptance of the vessel was imminent. The second boat, Pipinos, was officially launched on 6 October 2014 and passed through Greek harbour acceptance trials in Elefsina.

On 21 September 2009, TKMS announced that the contract with the Greek Navy for all four submarines had been cancelled due to country's arrears of more than 520 million Euros. TKMS began seeking arbitration to resolve the matter.

On 27 October 2009, the Greek Ministry of Defence confirmed that they intended to accept the three boats built in Greece. The Greek Papanikolis U214 class is equipped with a hoistable radar mast which does not penetrate the pressure hull of the submarine. In the top of the radar mast the radar transmitter is installed. This transmitter is part of the SPHINX Radar System supplied by Thales Defence Deutschland GmbH in Kiel. The radar sensor is a FMCW transceiver which can't be detected by ESM systems in medium terms. This technology is so called LPI radar, which means "Low probability of intercept". The transmitting power is lower than the power of a mobile phone but the resolution more precise compared to high power Pulse radar. Thales SPHINX radar is a tactical radar, designed for submarines. Greece ordered four submarines and paid the list price of six. (2 bn euros)

Portugal

In 2005 Portugal awarded a contract to Howaldtswerke-Deutsche Werft for two Type 214 submarines, which were delivered in 2010. These two submarines, called, NRP Tridente (S160) and NRP Arpão (S161) are today the only submarines in active service in the Portuguese Navy and replaced the Albacora-class submarines in 2010. In 2014, the two submarines received new UGM-84G Sub-Harpoon Block II missiles. From 2016 to 2018 the Tridente submarine carried out a major mid-term overhaul at Thyssenkrupp Marine Systems shipyards, and the Arpão submarine, from 2018 to 2021 carried out a major mid-term overhaul at the Portuguese Arsenal do Alfeite shipyards The Portuguese Military Programming Law signed in May 2019 aims for the modernization of the two submarines by 2030.

South Korea

The South Korean Son Won-Il U214-class submarine (Hangul: 손원일급 잠수함, Hanja: 孫元一級潛水艦) is equipped with a SPHINX-D Radar System supplied by Thales Defence Deutschland GmbH. It uses an additional pulse transmitter in the top of the mast. The combination of high power pulse radar and a very low power LPI transmitter is very effective for submarines. During surface operations, the boat sails with an open pulse fingerprint for ESM systems, but within a secret mission the operator switches to LPI mode. The boat remains invisible to others. Total of 9 are planned and 8 are in active duty. South Korea ordered its first three KSS-II/ Type 214 boats in 2000, which were assembled by Hyundai Heavy Industries. The Batch 2 order will add six more submarines to the Navy, to be built by Daewoo Shipbuilding & Marine Engineering.

In March 2008, it was reported in the media that the first Type 214 submarine of the Republic of Korea Navy suffered from defects related to excessive noise from the screw, according to anonymous sources. Later ROKN denied the report. There were no further reports of such noise problems in succeeding South Korean Type 214 submarines. The first three Type 214 submarines of South Korea were built by Hyundai Heavy Industries. In August 2008, South Korea signed another contract with HDW for six more Type 214 submarines. The Batch 2 order will add six more submarines to the Navy, to be built by Daewoo Shipbuilding & Marine Engineering. Hong Beom-do, a specialized guided missile submarine was launched on 5 April 2016.

Future operators

Turkey

The first request by the Turkish Naval Forces was made in 2009 and considered to be delivered in 2014. However, due to delay, a new contract was signed in 2016 and it is planned to be delivered in 2020.
The Turkish Navy had commenced negotiations with HDW for six licence-built Type 214 class air-independent propulsion (AIP) submarines. According to the Undersecretariat for Defence Industries of the Turkish Government these submarines will be produced with maximum local content at Gölcük Naval Shipyard in Kocaeli, Turkey.

On 2 July 2009, HDW and the Turkish Ministry of Defence entered into an agreement for the licensed production of six platforms. The agreement was the largest defence acquisition project in Turkey at the time after the firm order for 116 F-35 fighters at a cost of in excess of $10 billion. Ankara hoped that its advanced, locally produced and highly modified Type 214 submarines will enter into service by 2015. Defence Minister Vecdi Gonul stated that "Turkish industrial participation in the project would be worth around 80 percent of the total value of the deal".

As the Turkish Type 214 will have a significant amount of Turkish indigenous systems on board, this variant of the Type 214 will be known as the Type 214TN (Turkish Navy). HDW will preassemble classified elements such as the fuel cells and propulsion system and will then ship them to Turkey. All electronic and weapon systems (including the C4I system) will be of Turkish production.

On 1 July 2011, the 2 billion euros order for six U 214 submarine material packages placed with ThyssenKrupp Marine Systems by Turkey entered into force with receipt of the advance payment. This enabled ThyssenKrupp to begin executing the order. The order was designated to contribute to securing employment at HDW in Kiel, as well as at many subcontractors in Germany and Turkey, for the next ten years. Yet, recently Turkey has received around 2 Million euros compensation from ThyssenKrupp due to delayed manufacturing of the Type214TN. A possible reason for this delay is Turkey's demand for in-house developed software within the submarines. However, Germany refused Greek demands to block delivering six Type 214 submarines to Turkey, as the manufacturer Thyssen was bound by contracts signed since 2002.

Indonesia

In the MEF III (Minimum Essential Force) it mentioned the Type 214 submarine from Germany alongside the  submarine from France. The Indonesian Navy is planning in procuring four to six

superior Type 214 submarines and two Scorpene submarines. 

On 2 March 2021, representatives of the German shipbuilder TKMS began discussions with the Indonesian Ministry of Defense and the Ministry of State Owned Enterprises regarding the procurement of up to four submarines of the Type 214 submarine.

Failed bids

Pakistan

In 2008, the Pakistan Navy entered in negotiation of possibly purchasing three Type 214 to be built in KSEW through a technology transfer, and the HDW CEO  Walter Freitag confirming and reportedly telling the news media in Pakistan during the IDEAS 2008 convention that: "The commercial contract has been finalised up to 95 per cent."

It was reported that the first Type 214 diesel-electric submarine would be delivered to the Pakistan Navy in 64 months after signing of the contract while the rest would be completed successively in 12 months. After wavering for over two years, Pakistan dropped out from this deal when successfully negotiating with China to develop and design Eight Type 039A submarine that features the AIP technology with a complete transfer of technology to be built in Pakistan.

Vessels by nation

See also 
List of submarine classes in service

Submarines of similar comparison
 Type 212 submarine - A class of diesel-electric attack-submarines developed by ThyssenKrupp Marine Systems and exclusively built for the German Navy, the Italian Navy and the Royal Norwegian Navy.
 Type 218SG submarine - A class of extensively-customised diesel-electric attack-submarines developed ThyssenKrupp Marine Systems and currently operated by the Republic of Singapore Navy.
  - A class of extensively-customised diesel-electric attack-submarines developed by ThyssenKrupp Marine Systems and currently operated by Israel.
  - A unique class of  diesel-electric attack-submarines developed by ThyssenKrupp Marine Systems and currently being built for Israel.
  - A class of export-oriented diesel-electric attack-submarines, jointly developed by Naval Group and Navantia and currently operated by the Chilean Navy, the Royal Malaysian Navy, the Indian Navy and the Brazilian Navy.
 S-80 Plus submarine - A class of conventionally-powered attack-submarines, currently being built by Navantia for the Spanish Navy.
 Blekinge-class submarine is a class of submarine developed by Kockums for the Swedish Navy
 KSS-III submarine - A class of diesel-electric attack submarines, built by Daewoo Shipbuilding & Marine Engineering and Hyundai Heavy Industries and operated by the Republic of Korea Navy.
  - A class of diesel-electric attack-submarines, built by Mitsubishi Heavy Industries for the Japan Maritime Self-Defense Force.
  - A class of diesel-electric attack submarines currently being built by Mitsubishi Heavy Industries and Kawasaki Heavy Industries for the Japan Maritime Self-Defense Force
 Type 039A submarine - A class of diesel-electric attack-submarines operated by the People's Liberation Army Navy (China) and being built for the navies of the Royal Thai Navy and the Pakistan Navy.
  - A class of diesel-electric attack-submarines being built for Russia.

References

External links
Naval Technology
 : Extensive and detailed photographic coverage of Greek submarines Matrozos (S-122) and Pipinos (S-121) 
 ''Specification of "Papanikolis" class" (Hellenic Navy website)
Submarine Papanikolis (S-120) From the Hellenic Navy website 
 .
Global Security
Hellenic-shipyards
Yeni Tip Denizaltı Projesi 

Attack submarines
Hydrogen-powered submarines
Submarine classes